Alessandro Pertini  (25 September 1896 – 24 February 1990), better known as Sandro Pertini, was an Italian socialist politician who served as the president of Italy from 1978 to 1985.

Early life
Born in Stella (Province of Savona) as the son of a wealthy landowner, Alberto, he studied at a Salesian college in Varazze, and completed his schooling at the "Chiabrera" lyceum (high school) in Savona.

His philosophy teacher was Adelchi Baratono, a reformist socialist who contributed to his approach to socialism and probably introduced him to the inner circles of the Ligurian labour movements. Pertini obtained a law degree from the University of Genoa.

Aged 19 when Italy entered World War I on the side of the Triple Entente, Pertini opposed the war, but nonetheless enlisted in the army where he served as a lieutenant and was decorated for bravery. After the armistice in 1918, he joined the Unitary Socialist Party, PSU, then he settled in Florence where he also graduated in political science with a thesis entitled La Cooperazione ("Cooperation"; 1924). While in the city, Pertini also came into contact with people such as Gaetano Salvemini, the brothers Carlo and Nello Rosselli, and Ernesto Rossi. Pertini was physically beaten by Fascist squads on several occasions, but never lost faith in his ideals.

Resistance to Fascism
After the assassination of PSU leader Giacomo Matteotti by Fascists in 1924, Pertini became even more committed to the struggle against the totalitarian regime. In 1926, he was sentenced to internment but managed to go into hiding. Later, together with Carlo Rosselli and Ferruccio Parri, he organized and accompanied the escape to France of Filippo Turati, who was the most prominent figure of the PSU. Pertini remained in the country until 1926 working as a mason. According to the Italian historian of Freemasonry Aldo Alessandro Mola, during that period Pertini had relationships with exponents of the Grand Orient of Italy who were in exile in France. This hypothesis seems unsupported by known documents from archives. On his return to Italy, he was arrested in Pisa, tried, and sentenced to ten years' imprisonment.

In 1935 he was interned on Santo Stefano Island, Ventotene (LT), Pontine Islands, an island in the Tyrrhenian Sea, where he remained through Italy's entry into World War II and until 1943. There he saved the famous diaries of Antonio Gramsci. Although he had begun suffering from severe illness, Pertini never demanded pardon. He was released a month after Benito Mussolini's arrest and joined the Italian resistance movement against the Nazi German occupiers and Mussolini's new regime – the Italian Social Republic. Arrested by the Germans, he was sentenced to death but freed by a partisan raid. Pertini then traveled north to organize partisan war as an executive member of PSI (alongside Rodolfo Morandi and Lelio Basso). He had a primary role in the Milan uprising of 25 April 1945, which led to the execution of Mussolini.

Prominence
After the war ended in Italy on 25 April 1945 and the monarchy was abolished through the 1946 Italian constitutional referendum, Pertini was elected to the Constituent Assembly (La Costituente), the body that prepared the new republican Italian Constitution. In the postwar era he was a prominent member of the directive board of the Italian Socialist Party (the PSI, which the PSU had rejoined).

In spite of his intransigent attitude toward the Italian Communist Party, Pertini was suspicious of many policies enforced by the PSI. He criticized all forms of colonialism, as well as corruption in the Italian state and within the socialist party, where he kept an independent political position.

He was elected president of the Italian Chamber of Deputies in 1968.

President (1978–1985)

In 1978, the 81-year-old Pertini was elected President of the Italian Republic, the highest office in the nation. Despite his advanced age, he displayed considerable energy and vigor, playing a major role in helping restore the public's faith in the government and institutions of Italy, as well as maintaining an active schedule of traveling and meeting foreign dignitaries. During the Brigate Rosse terrorism period of the Anni di piombo, Pertini openly denounced the violence. He also opposed organized crime in Italy, South African apartheid, Chilean dictator Augusto Pinochet and other dictatorial regimes, as well as the Soviet invasion of Afghanistan.

In 1981, Pertini presided over the formation of the government by Giovanni Spadolini, the first non Christian Democratic Italian government since the time of De Gasperi.

In 1985, he stepped down from the presidency, becoming automatically senator for life. The only official role he accepted in his retirement was President of the "Filippo Turati" Foundation for Historical Studies of Florence inaugurated in 1985 and dedicated to recording and preserving the history of the socialist movement in Italy. In December 1988 Pertini was the first person to be awarded with the Otto Hahn Peace Medal in Gold by the United Nations Association of Germany (Deutsche Gesellschaft für die Vereinten Nationen, DGVN) in Berlin, "for outstanding services to peace and international understanding, especially for his political ethics and practical humanity." Pertini died in February 1990 at the age of 93 and was mourned across the nation.

1982 World Cup Final

Pertini attended the 1982 World Cup Final in Madrid for a match between Italy and West Germany just two days after the fourth anniversary of his inauguration. After Italy scored their third goal, he wagged his finger to either the German delegation or King Juan Carlos I, and said "they [the German team] will not catch us any more". Memorable images from the event are Pertini standing on his chair at Santiago Bernabeu stadium, exulting in the Italian victory, and the card game on the return flight, between the president and three team members (trainer Bearzot and players Causio and Zoff), the world cup trophy next to them on the table.

Paolo Rossi, Italy's and the tournament's top scorer, later said: "I remember that when he welcomed us at the Presidential Palace after our win, he rose and said: 'This is my best day as President.'"

Relationship with Pope John Paul II

Sandro Pertini had a close friendship with Pope John Paul II, with whom he met often both for official and private occasions, and had frequent phone conversations. In "Accanto a Giovanni Paolo II", he is known to have referred to his mother looking over him in heaven, moved that her atheist son was friends with the Pope.

On 13 May 1981 he went to the Gemelli Hospital as soon as he heard that the Pope had been shot, and stayed until late in the night when he was told that the Pope was not in danger anymore. He recalled the event later that year in the annual New Year's Eve Presidential Address to the Italian People.

Honours and awards
In 1986 he received the Freedom medal.

In popular culture
In the 1975 film Last Days of Mussolini, by Carlo Lizzani, there is a character inspired to Pertini, performed by Sergio Graziani.
In early 1980s Andrea Pazienza created the comic book series Il Partigiano Pert ("The Partisan Pert"), a comedy strip portraying Pertini during World War II with the same cartoonist as his helper.
Pertini has been mentioned in some verses of several Italian songs, as in Sotto la pioggia ("under the rain", 1982) by Antonello Venditti, Babbo Rock ("Daddy Rock", 1982) by the Skiantos, L'Italiano ("The Italian", 1983) by Toto Cutugno, Caro Presidente ("Dear President", 1984) by Daniele Shook, Pertini Dance (1984) by the S.C.O.R.T.A., Pertini Is A Genius, Mirinzini Is Not Famous (2007) by the Ex-Otago.

Electoral history

References

External links

 A biography of Pertini from the Associazione Nazionale Sandro Pertini
 Fondazione Sandro Pertini

|-

1896 births
1990 deaths
People from the Province of Savona
Unitary Socialist Party (Italy, 1922) politicians
Italian Socialist Party politicians
Presidents of Italy
Members of the National Council (Italy)
Members of the Constituent Assembly of Italy
Senators of Legislature I of Italy
Presidents of the Chamber of Deputies (Italy)
Deputies of Legislature II of Italy
Deputies of Legislature III of Italy
Deputies of Legislature IV of Italy
Deputies of Legislature V of Italy
Deputies of Legislature VI of Italy
Deputies of Legislature VII of Italy
Italian life senators
Politicians of Liguria
University of Genoa alumni
Italian anti-capitalists
Italian anti-fascists
Italian resistance movement members
Recipients of the Gold Medal of Military Valor
Recipients of the Silver Medal of Military Valor
Recipients of the Four Freedoms Award
Exiled Italian politicians